David B. Healy (22 December 1936 – 6 June 2011) was an American astrophotographer and asteroid discoverer who is known for his contributions to Burnham's Celestial Handbook.

History
David B. Healy was born 1936 in Los Angeles, California. He was an automotive industry analyst for Drexel Burnham in New York and later a stock broker before retiring to Arizona. He dedicated his life to Astronomy and the discovery of planets. While in New York, he was a longtime member of the Astronomical Society of Long Island. Once in Sierra Vista, Arizona, he became a valued member of the Huachuca Astronomy Club.

He was well known for his pioneering work in astrophotography (in particular with cooled and hypered emulsion astrophotography before silver became silicon) with multiple contributions to leading astronomy publications. Healy established the Junk Bond Observatory in Arizona for visual work and recoveries of minor planets.

On September 4, 1999 a main-belt asteroid  was discovered by Myke Collins and M. White at Anza. It was called 66479 Healy after the founder of the JBO. Healy was also an original contributor to Burnham's Celestial Handbook. The JBO established by Healy operates a 32-inch Ritchey Chretien reflector chiefly for minor planet astrometry and is credited with over 500 discoveries. After his chief co-discoverer Jeffrey Medkeff died in 2008, Dave decided to participate in the search for exo-planets. His telescope is still being used in the search for these planetary systems.

He was a Contributing Editor of Astronomy Magazine. Bloomberg Press reviewed Healy's transition from investment analyst to amateur astronomer in the following article.

List of discovered minor planets

References 
 

1936 births
2011 deaths
American astronomers
Discoverers of minor planets